Otto Larsen may refer to:
 Otto Larsen (footballer)
 Otto Larsen (sociologist)